Bioaccumulation is the gradual accumulation of substances, such as pesticides or other chemicals, in an organism.  Bioaccumulation occurs when an organism absorbs a substance at a rate faster than that at which the substance is lost or eliminated by catabolism and excretion. Thus, the longer the biological half-life of a toxic substance, the greater the risk of chronic poisoning, even if environmental levels of the toxin are not very high. Bioaccumulation, for example in fish, can be predicted by models. Hypothesis for molecular size cutoff criteria for use as bioaccumulation potential indicators are not supported by data. Biotransformation can strongly modify bioaccumulation of chemicals in an organism.

Toxicity induced by metals is associated with bioaccumulation and biomagnification. Storage or uptake of metals faster than the rate at which an organism metabolizes and excretes lead to the accumulation of that metal. The presence of various chemicals and harmful substances in the environment can be analyzed and assessed with a proper knowledge on bioaccumulation helping with chemical control and usage.

Uptake of chemicals by an organism can take place by breathing, absorbing through skin or swallowing. When the concentration of a chemical is higher within the organism compared to its surroundings (air or water), it is referred to as bioconcentration. Biomagnification is another process related to bioaccumulation as the concentration of the chemical or metal increases as it moves up from one trophic level to another. Naturally, the process of bioaccumulation is necessary for an organism to grow and develop; however, accumulation of harmful substances can also occur.

Examples

Terrestrial examples 
An example of poisoning in the workplace can be seen from the phrase "mad as a hatter" (18th and 19th century England). The process for stiffening the felt then used in making hats involved mercury.  This forms organic species such as methylmercury, which is lipid-soluble, and tends to accumulate in the brain, resulting in mercury poisoning. Other lipid-soluble (fat-soluble) poisons include tetraethyllead compounds (the lead in leaded petrol), and DDT. These compounds are stored in the bodyfat, and when the fatty tissues are used for energy, the compounds are released and cause acute poisoning.

Strontium-90, part of the fallout from atomic bombs, is chemically similar enough to calcium that it is utilized in osteogenesis, where its radiation can cause damage for a long time.

Some animal species exhibit bioaccumulation as a mode of defense; by consuming toxic plants or animal prey, a species may accumulate the toxin, which then presents a deterrent to a potential predator. One example is the tobacco hornworm, which concentrates nicotine to a toxic level in its body as it consumes tobacco plants.
Poisoning of small consumers can be passed along the food chain to affect the consumers later on.
Other compounds that are not normally considered toxic can be accumulated to toxic levels in organisms. The classic example is of vitamin A, which becomes concentrated in carnivore livers of e.g. polar bears: as a pure carnivore that feeds on other carnivores (seals), they accumulate extremely large amounts of vitamin A in their livers. It was known by the native peoples of the Arctic that the livers of carnivores should not be eaten, but Arctic explorers have suffered hypervitaminosis A from eating the livers of bears (and there has been at least one example of similar poisoning of Antarctic explorers eating husky dog livers).  One notable example of this is the expedition of Sir Douglas Mawson, where his exploration companion died from eating the liver of one of their dogs.

Aquatic examples 
Coastal fish (such as the smooth toadfish) and seabirds (such as the Atlantic puffin) are often monitored for heavy metal bioaccumulation. Methylmercury gets into freshwater systems through industrial emissions and rain. As its concentration increases up the food web, it can reach dangerous levels for both fish and the humans who rely on fish as a food source.

Naturally produced toxins can also bioaccumulate. The marine algal blooms known as "red tides" can result in local filter-feeding organisms such as mussels and oysters becoming toxic; coral reef fish can be responsible for the poisoning known as ciguatera when they accumulate a toxin called ciguatoxin from reef algae.

In some eutrophic aquatic systems, biodilution can occur. This trend is a decrease in a contaminant with an increase in trophic level and is due to higher concentrations of algae and bacteria to "dilute" the concentration of the pollutant.

Wetland acidification can raise the chemical or metal concentrations which lead to an increased bioavailability in marine plants and freshwater biota. Plants situated there which includes both rooted and submerged plants can be influenced by the bioavailability of metals.

See also 
 Biomagnification (magnification of toxins with increasing trophic level)
 Chelation therapy
 Drug accumulation ratio
 Environmental impact of pesticides
 International POPs Elimination Network
 Persistent organic pollutants
 Phytoremediation (removal of pollutants by bioaccumulation in plants)

References

External links
 Bioaccumulation & Biomagnification
 Biomagnification graphic 
 Biomagnification Definition Page
 Criteria used by the PBT Profiler
 Bioaccumulation & Biotransformation

Biodegradable waste management
Biodegradation
Ecotoxicology
Pollution
Species